Charles Uksila, Jr. (October 12, 1887 – March 4, 1964) was an American professional hockey player. He played for the Portland Rosebuds and Vancouver Millionaires of the Pacific Coast Hockey Association. He was a native of Calumet, Michigan, where he started his hockey career. Prior to playing with Portland, he was a member of the Multnomah Amateur Athletic Club. He was a member of the Rosebuds team that played the Montreal Canadiens in the 1916 Stanley Cup Finals.

Uksila retired from professional hockey after the 1918–19 season, and then worked as a fancy skating instructor at the Connaught Skating Club in Vancouver. He also toured in Australia where he performed as a figure skater alongside his sister in Sydney and Melbourne.

He died in Mountain View, California, in 1964. He was of Finnish descent.

References

Citations

External links

Additional stats

1887 births
1964 deaths
American people of Finnish descent
Ice hockey players from Michigan
People from Calumet, Michigan
Portland Rosebuds players
Vancouver Millionaires players
American men's ice hockey left wingers

http://cchockeyhistory.org/legends/U.htm

https://hockeygods.com/images/6521-Vancouver_Millionaires_Charles_Uksila

http://www.greatesthockeylegends.com/2014/09/charles-uksila.html?m=1